Hugh Meredith Reece-Edwards  (born 5 January 1961) is a former South African rugby union player. His regular playing position was Full-Back.

Playing career
Reece-Edwards represented Natal and made his debut for the province in 1982. He played for Natal until 1995 in 165 matches and scored a record of 1114 points. He was a member of the Natal team that won the Currie Cup in 1990 and 1992.

Reece-Edwards toured with the Springboks to France and England in 1992 and to Australia in 1993. He made his test debut against France on 17 October 1992 at the Stade de Gerland in Lyon. He played in the following test against France and then in one test on the Australian tour. He also played in nine tour matches scoring 103 points (3 tries, 23 conversions and 14 penalties).

Test history

Coaching career
Reece-Edwards acted as the assistant coach to Ian McIntosh at the Sharks from 1996 to 1999. In 2000 he was appointed as head coach, but his tenure only lasted for one year and was he replaced by Rudolf Straeuli.

See also
List of South Africa national rugby union players – Springbok no. 569

References

1961 births
Living people
South African rugby union coaches
South African rugby union players
South Africa international rugby union players
Sharks (Currie Cup) players
Rugby union players from Johannesburg
Rugby union fullbacks